Bill Friday is a Canadian retired ice hockey referee. He refereed 1,425 major league hockey games, and is the only referee to work both the Avco Cup finals in the World Hockey Association (WHA) and the Stanley Cup finals in the National Hockey League (NHL).

Friday started his officiating career in the NHL, and moved to the WHA in 1972. In 1976 he was named the WHA's referee-in-chief. Friday also served as the first president of the NHL Officials Association.

Honours
In 2010, Friday was an inaugural inductee into the Hamilton Sports Hall of Fame.

In 2012, Friday was elected to the World Hockey Association Hall of Fame.

References

Living people
National Hockey League officials
Ice hockey people from Ontario
1933 births